Arnoud W.A. Boot (born January 2, 1960 – Huizen, Netherlands) is a Dutch economist and professor of Corporate Finance and Financial Markets at the University of Amsterdam. He is a member of the Royal Netherlands Academy of Arts and Sciences since 2008.

He currently serves as chairman of the European Finance Association (EFA), and also chairs the Sustainable Finance Lab (SFL), an Utrecht-based initiative that stands for the financial stability and the environmental sustainability of finance. Professor Boot is also council member of the Dutch Scientific Council for Government Policy (WRR) and research fellow at the Center for Economic Policy Research (CEPR) in London.

Earlier in his career, he was a faculty member at the J.L. Kellogg Graduate School of Management at Northwestern University in the USA. In 2000-2001 he was a partner in the Finance and Strategy Practice at McKinsey & Company. From 2006-2014 he was chairman of the Royal Netherlands Economics Association.

Academic work

His current research focuses on corporate finance and financial institutions and covers a wide range of related issues including corporate governance, and the transaction-based emphasis of the financial sector and society at large including the phenomenon of footloose corporations. Further research interests are issues related to the regulation and structure of financial institutions, security design and capital structure. Special focus in his research goes out to relationship banking, an important and returning topic in many of his publications. The potential friction between short-term oriented transactional activities and a longer-term relationship-oriented focus has his particular interest (see  for example: Relationship Banking: What Do We Know?, 2000, Journal of Financial Intermediation;, Can Relationship Banking Survive Competition?, 2000, Journal of Finance;, Banking and Trading, 2016, Review of Finance).

He has written various books, among them the textbook Contemporary Financial Intermediation, 2016;, Handbook of Financial Intermediation and Banking, 2008;, 
Financiering en macht: van financiële structuur tot beheersstructuur (Finance and Power), 1997, and De ontwortelde onderneming: Ondernemingen overgeleverd aan financiers? (The Footloose Corporation), 2009. He has published in major international academic journals such as The American Economic Review, the Journal of Finance, and the Review of Financial Studies. As lead author of the Dutch Scientific Council for Government Policy (WRR) Boot presented in 2016 a report to the Dutch government on the balance between society and the financial sector, emphasizing the need to reduce the vulnerability of society towards financial instabilities.

Other positions past, present and recognition

Arnoud Boot is a member of the Financial Economists Roundtable. He is director of the Amsterdam Center for Corporate Finance (ACCF) – a think tank that seeks to engage academia, policymakers and the business world on issues related to corporate finance and the functioning of the financial sector. He is also advisor to Optiver Holding in the Netherlands. He holds an honorary visiting professorship at the University of Ljubliana in Slovenia.

During 2011-2015 he was a member of the Inaugural Scientific Advisory Committee of the European Systemic Risk Board (ESRB). He was president of the European Finance Association in 2008, and president of the Financial Intermediation Research Society (FIRS) in 2012–2014. From 2006 though early 2019 he was chairman of the Bank Council of the Dutch Central Bank (DNB). In 2008 and 2015 he was a member of the Quality Assessment Committees for business administration programs for the Israeli Ministry of Education. From 2004 to 2014 he was a crown member (Kroonlid) of the Dutch Social-Economic Council (SER). During 2014 he chaired a Dutch government committee that designed the new high school curriculum for business economics (M&O). In 2003 he created the Amsterdam Center for Law & Economics (ACLE), an interdisciplinary research center linked to the faculties of economics and law at the University of Amsterdam.

Arnoud Boot is since 2014 an honorary member of the Royal Netherlands Economic Association (KVS). In 1998 he was awarded the Limperg Penning in recognition of contributions to business administration, in 2011 the Pierson Penning, a once in three year recognition for contributions to economics. In 2010 he was featured in the HUMAN TV documentary De magie van de wetenschap. Roepende in de woestijn.

Arnoud Boot is married and has two adult daughters. He has a passion for running and tennis.

References

1960 births
Dutch economists
Living people
Members of the Royal Netherlands Academy of Arts and Sciences
People from Huizen
Academic staff of the University of Amsterdam